Vangelis Paraprastanitis (born 18 October 1954) is a Greek former professional footballer, who played as a defender. His nickname was "Johnny", due to his similar appearance with decathlete Johnny Weissmuller.

Club career
Paraprastanitis began his systematic involvement in football at the age of 13 when in 1968 he joined the team of his village, Proodos Mouzaki under the technical guidance of coach Mandelou. His fame quickly spread beyond the borders of Mouzaki and in 1973 he was transferred to Trikala. There, coached by Pangalos, he unfolded the aspects of his rich talent, as a result of which he was called upon to cover almost all positions in the eleven, always distinguishing himself either as an attacker or as a defender or as a midfielder. His appearances aroused the interest of the great clubs of Athens and Thessaloniki. Olympiacos was the first who tried to sign in 1977, even giving two friendlies to the team of Trikala exclusively to watch him. The transfer broke down at the last moment for unknown reasons and the following year it was the turn of Panathinaikos to be interested in him, but the transfer was not completed again. PAOK and Aris followed in 1979 without succeeding in adding him to their team. The disappointment of Paraprastanitis was such that he even thought of immigrating to Canada in search of better financial rewards and an improvement in the conditions in his life. All this, but also his burning desire to play in a big team, was made a reality by the then Superintendent of AEK Athens, Thanasis Tsitos in December 1979, who convinced the club's management about the value of the footballer. Finally Paraprastanitis was transferred to AEK instead of approximately 4 million drachmas in order to provide solutions for the positions in the defense. He was then established by Miltos Papapostolou at the left side of the defense. At AEK, he certainly did not impress since the administrative upheavals and the fact that he was a choice of the administration of Loukas Barlos, soon brought him out of favor on the part of Zafiropoulos. He left relatively soon, in 1984, for Egaleo, which wanted him even before his transfer to AEK. In Aegaleo he had a long career as a stopper, following them in all categories until 1992 when he stopped playing football at the age of 38.

International caree
Paraprasanitis played one game for Greece against Australia in a 3–3 draw, on 11 November 1980.

After football
Along with football, Paraprasanitis also served in the Fire Brigade. From 1997 he worked in various positions in the techichal leadership of Trikala.

Personal life
Paraprastanitis is married to Vasiliki Papaefthimiou and they have one daughter named Olga. On 22 February 2022 through his daughter he donated his football shoes to the New Museum of AEK Athens.

Honours

AEK Athens 
Greek Cup: 1982–83

References

External links

1954 births
Living people
Greek footballers
Trikala F.C. players
AEK Athens F.C. players
Egaleo F.C. players
Association football defenders
Greece international footballers
Greek football managers
Trikala F.C. managers
People from Mouzaki
Footballers from Thessaly